Jordan Webb (born 24 March 1988) is a Canadian professional soccer player who plays as a winger with Electric City FC.

Early and personal life
Webb attended Pine Ridge Secondary School. His cousin Anthony Bahadur is also a soccer player who suggested that Webb move to Singapore to play.

Youth career
After playing youth soccer for the East York Komets in Toronto, he signed a two-year soccer scholarship in August 2007 with the Iowa Central Community College. During the college off season he played in the USL Premier Development League from 2007 till 2009 with the Cleveland Internationals, Springfield Demize, and Toronto Lynx. In 2009, he played for the Italia Shooters in the Canadian Soccer League.

Club career 
He began his professional career in 2010, playing for Hougang United on the recommendation of his cousin Anthony Bahadur and breaking a college scholarship in the process. He later played for Home United, Young Lions and Tampines Rovers. With Home United he won the 2013 Singapore Cup.

He helped himself to 14 goals and 11 assists in all competitions for Tampines in the 2016 S.League season, outshining the former Arsenal and Liverpool midfielder Jermaine Pennant, who was also playing for Tampines, in the process.

Warriors FC 
He joined Warriors for the 2017 season. In March 2017, Webb claimed to be the victim of slanderous racial abuse  in an S.League match, stating that Balestier Khalsa player Raihan Rahman had used a derogatory term against him. Webb scored six goals in his first seven outings for the Warriors but did not net in the S.League again until October in a 3–2 away defeat to Brunei DPMM.

Return to Tampines Rovers 
He returned to former club Tampines Rovers after a season with Warriors FC for the 2018 Singapore Premier League season, with the Tampines Head Coach branding him as one of the best wingers in Singapore. He rejected an offer from a Portuguese 2nd tier side to re-sign for Tampines Rovers.

In his second season with the club, he helped the Stags win the 2019 Singapore Cup.

At the end of 2020, he left the club and Singapore and announced that he would be returning to Canada to continue his career.

Atlético Ottawa
On 13 April 2021, Atlético Ottawa confirmed the signing of Webb for the upcoming season. On 27 July Ottawa announced that the club had terminated Webb's contract by mutual consent due to a "personal situation."

Scarborough SC 
On 28 August 2021, he returned to the Canadian Soccer League to play with Scarborough SC and recorded two goals in his debut match against Toronto Tigers. He featured in the ProSound Cup final against FC Vorkuta but was defeated in a penalty shootout. He returned for a match on 5 June 2022, against Toronto Falcons where he recorded a goal.

Electric City
In March 2022, he signed with Electric City FC of League1 Ontario.

International career
In November 2015, he announced his desire to represent Singapore at the international level, subject to receiving a Singaporean passport. He received permanent residency status in June 2017.

Honours 

Home United
Singapore Cup: 2013

 Tampines Rovers
Singapore Cup: 2019

References

1988 births
Living people
Canadian soccer players
Soccer people from Ontario
People from Pickering, Ontario
Cleveland Internationals players
Springfield Demize players
Toronto Lynx players
York Region Shooters players
Hougang United FC players
Home United FC players
Young Lions FC players
Tampines Rovers FC players
Warriors FC players
Atlético Ottawa players
Scarborough SC players
USL League Two players
Canadian Soccer League (1998–present) players
Singapore Premier League players
Association football wingers
Canadian expatriate soccer players
Canadian expatriate sportspeople in the United States
Expatriate soccer players in the United States
Canadian expatriate sportspeople in Singapore
Expatriate footballers in Singapore
Electric City FC players
League1 Ontario players
Black Canadian soccer players